Nicolas Jurnjack is a French-born hair stylist who works in the fashion and beauty industry his credits include  Vogue, Elle, Harper’s Bazaar, as well as runway work for designers Alexander McQueen, John Galliano and Alber Elbaz.

Career
Jurnjack was born and raised in Marseille in the South of France, the youngest of 6 children. As a teenager while working in a hair salon as an apprentice, the right place at the right time,  he got his first opportunity to style a swimwear shoot for French Elle.

He then moved to Paris, to study hair styling via magazine clippings and plastic heads. He was then hired for styling a cover shoot for French Vogue, his first of hundreds of covers."Nicolas Jurnjack Portfolio"

He has received repeat nominations for France's Best Stylist of the Year and receiving Australia's "Leading Session Stylist of the Year". His work has been shown in the Louvre Museum - six black and white portraits styled by Jurnjack were hung there as part of the International Festival of Fashion Photography. Three were shot by Jeanloup Sieff where the concept was "Paper Hair," and three were shot by Christoph Sillem with the concept of hair created out of match sticks

Nicolas Jurnjack has styled hair for models including Adriana Lima, Bella Hadid, Natasha Poly, Gisele Bündchen, Naomi Campbell, Kate Moss, Carmen Kass, Cindy Crawford, Elle Macpherson, Thomas Boureau and Natalia Vodianova. Celebrities he has styled for include Lea Seydoux, Valeria Bruni Tedeschi, Charlotte Gainsbourg, Estelle Deniaud, Mélanie Thierry Jennifer Lopez, Elisa Sednaoui, Rachel McAdams, Laetitia Casta Juliette Binoche, Alicia Keys, Kristen Stewart, Kiernan Shipka. Kangana Ranaut.

He has created fashion week runway looks for designers, including Alexander McQueen, Alexander McQueen for Givenchy, Jean-Paul Gaultier, Marc Jacobs, John Galliano, Nina Ricci, Alber Elbaz, Olivier Theyskens, Jeremy Scott, Badgley Mischka, Antonio Berardi, Guy Laroche, Richard Tyler and Kenzo. Jurnjack has also styled hair for editorials and covers of many fashion and industry publications, including Vogue US, Vogue Paris, Vogue Italia, Vogue UK and other international Vogue editions, Allure, V Magazine, Harper's Bazaar, Elle, i-D Magazine, The New York Times Magazine, Le Monde, The Sunday Times Style and The Guardian.

In addition, Jurnjack has worked as the Creative Consultant for Jacques Dessange International (for 5 seasons), the Creative Consultant for L'Oreal Techni-Art, as well as the Creative Director (freelance) for Australian Vogue Beauty. Jurnjack's name has been used to endorse brands such as: Jean Louis David, Jean Marc Maniatis, Redken, Matrix, L'Oréal, Schwarzkopf, Cutler, Wella and Avon.

IN THE HAIR: A Fashion Hairstylist's Journey of Creativity, his first book was published in French and English in 2017,

UNEC MAG: Union Nationale des Entreprises de Coiffure, #25 Juillet-Aout 2019
"Internationalement reconnu, Nicolas Jurnjack a réalisé des coiffures exceptionnelles dont près de 400 couvertures pour Vogue et Harper's Bazaar".

ACTU FRANCE:"Le célèbre coiffeur de mode français Nicolas Jurnjack anime un débat à l’issue de la projection du film McQUEEN, un documentaire passionnant qui rend hommage au créateur de haute-couture Alexander McQueen.

MCB Hair World Conference Nicolas Jurnjack Speaker

AVEDA: Nicolas Jurnjack Special Guest Presentation at Aveda Hair World

ECHOS COIFFURE: Behind the scenes with Nicolas Jurnjack.

TOWN & COUNTRY: 20 Years Ago, Alexander McQueen Made Fashion History "McQueen asked French hairdresser Nicolas Jurnjack to do the hair"

HARPER'S BAZAAR: Picasso's Women 
 
ORIBE: A conversation with Nicolas Jurnjack

TUSH Magazine: Ost Frise - Nicolas Interview by Laura Dunklemann

References

External links
NICOLAS JURNJACK HAIRSTYLE PORTFOLIO
 Nicolas Jurnjack VOGUE & HARPER'S BAZAAR Covers
INFRINGE: Explore Genre-Defying Hair Pieces by Nicolas Jurnjack
ILES FORMULA: Hairtalk with Nicolas Jurnjack
currentMood Magazine: Interview with Nicolas Jurnjack
B-ALL: Love is All - Nicolas Jurnjack In The Hair
Harper's Bazaar: Siete gurús de la belleza en la era digital
toutMa: In the Hair de Nicolas JURNJACK
Oribe: A Conversation with Nicolas Jurnjack
Telegrah London Alexander-McQueen-the-fashion-show-that-made-his-name.html Alexander-McQueen-the-fashion-show-that-made-his-name. "McQueen asked Nicolas Jurnjack to do the hair.  "We met in his showroom, and it was only him, alone, and he showed me animal skins - fox, yak - and …"
NY Times Article on Albert Elbaz Designer
Hair Style references on models.com 
Fashion Industry top hairstylists
Nicolas Jurnjack behind-the-scenes on fashion shoots
 Printed Magazine Articles about Nicolas Jurnjack
Nicolas Jurnjack Hair Tutorials
Online Articles about Nicolas Jurnjack Hairstyles
 Antonio Berardi: Sex and Sensibility
Officiel de la couture et de la mode de Paris, Issues 839-841
LE PARIS Nicolas Jurnjack Behind the Scenes Wonderland with Hailey Baldwin
Elle Italy - Fay Campaign Behind the Scenes Nicolas Jurnjack, Michelangelo Di Battista

French hairdressers
Businesspeople from Marseille
Living people
Year of birth missing (living people)